The Sky Village is a young adult fantasy novel written by authors Chris Rettstatt, under the pseudonym Monk Ashland, and Nigel Ashland. It was published in hardcover on July 8, 2008. In the story, twelve-year-old Mei Long adventures across China in the Sky Village, a vast network of hot air balloons, in search of her mother, who has been taken prisoner by an army of intelligent machines (meks).

The book was the first of a planned series Kaimira, but on 11 March 2017, Rettstatt made a post on his blog confirming that no further books will be written in the series due to intellectual property issues.

As of January 2016, the book is in 316 libraries.

References

External links

Blog of author Chris Rettstatt

2008 American novels
2008 debut novels
American fantasy novels
American science fiction novels
Candlewick Press books